Brington Buhai Lyngdoh or B. B. Lyngdoh (2 February 1922 – 27 October 2003) was former Chief Ministers of Meghalaya, a state in north-eastern India. He was born at Laitlyngkot, a village twenty-five kilometres away from Shillong, on 2nd February, 1922. He is one of India's most well known statesman and is often referred to as the 'Father of coalition politics'. B. B. Lyngdoh was one of the prominent leaders on Meghalaya's Hills State movement.

Education
He started schooling in Ramakrishna Mission School at Shillong and Cherrapunjee. He attended high school at Government Boys High School. In 1939, he appeared in and secured the first position at the All Khasi and Jaintia Hills M.E. Scholarship Examination. In 1944, he completed his matriculation, after which he joined Guwahati Cotton College where he completed his Intermediate in Science and attained a Letter Mark in several subjects. He then attended the renowned Scottish Church College, Calcutta where he took Economics and Mathematics. He then switched to the Arts stream because of his interest in public service. Unfortunately, due to the prevailing Hindu-Muslim riots there at that time, he was forced to return and complete his studies from St. Edmund’s College in 1948. He returned to Calcutta University and completed his LLB in 1951.

Career 
He began teaching at Mawkhar Christian High School for a year before joining the Shillong Bar in 1952. He was soon elected General Secretary of the newly-formed Hills Tribal Union in 1954 (later called the All Party Hills Leaders Conference) in Tura, led by Captain Williamson A. Sangma, whose main agenda was the attainment of a separate State for the six Assam Hills Autonomous districts.

In 1962, B.B. Lyngdoh won his first election and a seat from the Nongpoh constituency of the Assam Assembly. In 1970, he joined the Meghalaya Autonomous State Cabinet as Finance Minister, a position he continued in till after Meghalaya attained full statehood in 1972. With the dissolution of the All Party Hills Leaders Conference in 1976, he contested again in 1978 from Lyngkyrdem constitutency and won.

He served as Chief Minister of Meghalaya for the first time in May, 1979. In 1980, he attended the Commonwealth Conference at Lusaka, Zambia as Chief Minister.

In March, 1983, he led another coalition Government and served as Chief Minister again with the HSPDP.

In 1988, he initiated the All Parties Coalition Government with P.A. Sangma as Chief Minister while he served as Chairman, State Planning Board. In 1990, he became the Chief Minister for the third time where he successfully introduced the M.L.A. Scheme to the country.

In 1992, B.B. Lyngdoh formed the Meghalaya Federation. In 1993, he contested in and successively won the Meghalaya Assembly elections for the seventh time and was elected Leader of The Opposition.

In 1998, he was re-elected to the Sixth Legisiative Assembly and served as the Chief Minister of Meghalaya for the fourth time.

References

Scottish Church College alumni
University of Calcutta alumni
Meghalaya politicians
2003 deaths
Chief Ministers of Meghalaya
United Democratic Party (Meghalaya) politicians
1921 births
Assam MLAs 1962–1967
Meghalaya MLAs 1978–1983
Meghalaya MLAs 1983–1988
Meghalaya MLAs 1988–1993
Meghalaya MLAs 1993–1998
Meghalaya MLAs 1998–2003